Shalu Nigam is an Indian lawyer, feminist legal scholar, and author. She was the petitioner in the landmark case Shalu Nigam v. Regional Passport Officer, decided on 17 May 2016, which held that passports can be issued without requiring the name of the father.

Biography
Shalu Nigam is a lawyer, feminist legal scholar and author. She is a TEDx speaker.

Her books include Domestic violence in India: What one should know? (a resource book), Women and Domestic Violence Law in India: A Quest for Justice, and Domestic Violence Law in India: Myth and Misogyny. She also co-authored The Founding Mothers: 15 Women Architect of the Indian Constitution. She is a contributor to Countercurrents.org and the South Asia Journal.

Education and career
Nigam has graduated from the Lady Irwin College, University of Delhi. She received her LLB from Delhi University, and a degree in MA in Social Work from Jamia Millia Islamia. She also obtained her doctorate in Social Work from Jamia Millia Islamia. The topic of her research was  "Changing doctor-patient relationship with special reference to the consumer protection act,1986"

Her post-doctoral fellowship at the Centre for Women's Development Studies was supported by the Indian Council of Social Science Research.

She has also been associated with and served as a Secretary of the People's Union for Civil Liberties (PUCL) Delhi. She started her career working with the United Nations High Commission for Refugees, Delhi office. Previously, she has worked with the Indian Social Institute, New Delhi on legal literacy, gender sensitization, legal awareness, legal research, training of para legals, training of trainers on human rights, prison reforms, and legal aid, besides preparing legal modules, training manuals, booklets and other training material

Nigam has been cited for her expertise on issues related to the rights of women, including legal and other protections for survivors of domestic violence, Battered Woman Syndrome, the right of self-defense, marital rape law, property rights, caste and the status of women, backlash against women's rights in the COVID-19 era, and the increase in violence against women during the COVID-19 pandemic. She has also been cited for her advocacy related to education in India. 
She is also known for her work on lawyers' dress vaccine equity and on transparency in governance

Advocacy
In April 2018, she joined the group of lawyers in Delhi who took out a silent protest march demanding that the lawyers in the Kathua rape case in Jammu and Kashmir who stood for the accused should be punished by the cancellation of licenses.

In 2020, she was one of over 600 activists, lawyers and academics who called for the release of Sudha Bharadwaj and Shoma Sen,. On 15 July 2020, she joined other lawyers and wrote to the Chief Justice of Patna High Court regarding the treatment of survivors of violent sexual crimes in the Araria District Court.

In July 2021, Nigam joined 900 individuals and groups condemning and calling for action against hate speech and misogyny directed at Muslim women online. In August 2021 she joined over 650 women’s rights activists and others who have denounced Union minority affairs’ minister Mukhtar Abbas Naqvi’s decision to commemorate the criminalisation of instant triple talaq as ‘Muslim Women’s Rights Day’. In November, 2021, she joined over 200 eminent citizens, including professors, civil servants, journalists and prominent activists who wrote an open letter to the Chief Justice of India, to draw his attention to the pending status of key matters in Supreme Court, covering issues from sedition, farm laws, Citizenship Amendment Act, electoral bonds among others.

In February 2022, she joined legal academics, lawyers, and students to write an open letter against the Karnataka High Court judgment that denied entry to young Muslim women wearing the hijab in the educational spaces. In May 2022, she joined a group of academics and professionals to write a letter to the Chief Minister of Delhi against demolition carried out in Jahangirpuri resettlement colony in Delhi In June 2022, she joined 300 citizens and wrote to the Chief Justice of India against the arrest of activist Teesta Setalvad and RB Sreekumar

Shalu Nigam v. Regional Passport Officer

Her daughter was born on 24 August 1997, and raised by Nigam, who had divorced her biological father. According to Nigam, her child was rejected by her father because she is female. In 2005 and 2011, Nigam was able to obtain a passport for her daughter without providing the name of her father, but at the next renewal, the computer application required it. Nigam brought a case to the Delhi High Court based on a violation of the right of her daughter to determine her name and identity. Nigam also asserted an injury to her daughter, if she was required to record the name of her father, due to the nature of the rejection by her father.

The Regional Passport Office (RPO) attorney argued RPO regulations forbade the removal of the name of a parent due to divorce, and argued it was an established legal principle that the dissolution of a parent-child relationship could only occur due to adoption. The Court found no legal requirement for the inclusion of the name of the father and directed that the computer software be changed to allow the issuance of the passport without requiring the name of the father. In its 17 May 2016 decision, the Court also stated, "This court also takes judicial notice of the fact that families of single parents are on the increase due to various reasons like unwed mothers, sex workers, surrogate mothers, rape survivors, children abandoned by father and also children born through IVF technology."

After advocacy by Women and Child Development Minister Maneka Gandhi to Foreign Affairs Minister Sushma Swaraj about the need to amend the passport rules for single women, a panel was created in July 2016 to debate and recommend changes, and its recommendations to ease the requirements were informed by the case. In December 2016, the Ministry of External Affairs announced new passport rules based on the panel recommendations, including to allow only one parent to be listed in the application.

Several scholars have noted the impact of the case on the rights of women in India.

Selected works

Books

Chapters

 Nigam Shalu (2018) #MeTooIndia is a tip of an iceberg and has shaken the patriarchy's core In #MeToo - A Blow to Patriarchy, Edited by Binu Mathew Published by People's Literature Publication and countercurrents.org 
 Nigam Shalu (2022) Adjudicating Domestic Violence in the Courts, In Routledge Readings on Law, Development and Legal Pluralism, Ecology, Families, Governance, Edited by Kalpana Kannabiran,

Papers

 Nigam Shalu (2005) Understanding  Justice  Delivery  System  from  the   Perspective  of  Women  Litigants  as  Victims  of   Domestic  Violence  in  India   (Specifically  in  the  Context  of  Section  498-A,  IPC), Occasional Paper No 39,  CWDS, New Delhi
 Nigam Shalu (2008) Legal Literacy: A Tool for Empowerment, Social Action, Volume 58 Issue (2) pp. 216–226
 Nigam Shalu (2014) Violence,  Protest  and  Change:  A  Socio-Legal  Analysis  of Extraordinary  Mobilization  after  the  2012  Delhi  Gang  Rape  Case, International  Journal  of  Gender  and  Women’s  Studies June  2014,  Vol.  2,  No.  2,  pp. 197–221
 Nigam Shalu (2017) Is Domestic Violence A Lesser Crime? Countering The Backlash Against Section 498A, IPC, Occasional Paper No 61, CWDS, New Delhi 
 Nigam Shalu (2020) COVID-19: Right to Life with Dignity and Violence in Homes, SPRI Vision, XI (1) 97-120
 Nigam Shalu (2020) A Hindu Daughter’s Right to Property: Is the retrospective amendment of Section 6 of the Hindu Succession Act a step towards women’s economic empowerment?, Legal News and Views, Volume 34 No.9 September Issue page 2-8

More
Nigam Shalu (2019) Gender Specific Laws on Violence in India, In Training Manual for Legal Empowerment of Women and Girls with Physical Disabilities in India, Editor Renu Addlakha, Center for Women's Development Studies, New Delhi
 Nigam Shalu (2019) Domestic Violence, In Training Manual for Empowerment of Women and Girls with Disabilities in India, Editor Renu Addlakha, Center for Women's Development Studies, New Delhi
 Nigam Shalu (2014) Yes, I am a woman, Countercurrents.org, 28 July
 Nigam Shalu (2021) Every little girl has a dream, a dream that will not die, Countercurrents.org, 27 September
 Nigam Shalu (2021) MeeLord! I am seeking justice as a citizen! Countercurrents.org, 20 November
 Nigam Shalu (2022) The Curses of Patriarchy, 8 November

In Hindi
 सूचना का अधिकार: कुछ सामाजिक वे कानूनी पहलू We the People Trust, Delhi ISBN 9788190367134
 Nigam Shalu (2022) दहेज प्रथा अभी भी क्यों कायम है जब कानून द्वारा इसे प्रतिबंधित कर दिया गया?
 लिव-इन रिलेशनशिप में महिलाओं के खिलाफ हिंसा और कानूनी सुरक्षा (2023)
 जब घूंघट बना इंक़लाब का परचम : हिजाब, नारीवाद और निरंकुशता

External links
 TEDx Talk on 12 March 2022 on Demystifying the Power of Law
 A Webinar on Implementing Domestic Violence Law in India: Are we asking the right questions? held on 16 December 2021

See also

 Domestic violence in India
 Protection of Women from Domestic Violence Act, 2005
 Dowry death

References

Living people
1970 births
Indian lawyers
Indian feminists
21st-century Indian writers
21st-century Indian women writers
Jamia Millia Islamia alumni
Women writers from Delhi
Indian feminist writers
Indian women academics
Indian women's rights activists
21st-century Indian women lawyers
Indian women activists
Indian social sciences writers
Indian human rights activists
Women educators from Delhi
Educators from Delhi